This article describes all the 2011 seasons of Formula Renault series across the world.

Formula Renault 3.5L

Formula Renault 2.0L

2011 Formula Renault 2.0 Eurocup season

2011 Formula Renault 2.0 Northern European Cup season

2011 Formula Renault 2.0 Alps season

2011 Formula Renault 2.0 UK season

2011 Formula Renault BARC season

2011 Formula Renault 2.0 Italia season

 Point system: 32, 28, 24, 22, 20, 18, 16, 14, 12, 10, 8, 6, 4, 2, 1 for 15th. In each race 2 points for Fastest lap and 2 for Pole position in race 1.
 Races: 2 race by rounds length of 30 minutes each.

2011 Asian Formula Renault Challenge season

 Point system: 30, 24, 20, 17, 15, 13, 11, 9, 7, 5, 4, 3, 2, 1 for 14th. No points for Fastest lap or Pole position. Drivers, that start their season at round 5 or later, don't receive any points for the final standing. The team point attribution is different from the driver point system: 10, 8, 6, 5, 4, 3, 2, 1.
 Races: 2 races by rounds.
 All races were held in China.

The Asian Challenge Category (A) reward the best Asian driver.

Formula Renault 1.6L

2011 French F4 Championship season

Replace the F4 Eurocup 1.6.

Other Formulas powered by Renault championships

2011 GP2 Series seasons

The GP2 Series and GP2 Asia Series are powered by 4 litre Renault V8 engines and Pirelli tyres with a new Dallara chassis.

2011 GP3 Series seasons

2011 V de V Challenge Monoplace season

2011 Austria Formel Renault Cup season
The season will be probably held on 14 rounds in 7 venues in Czech Republic, Germany, Belgium and Austria. The races occur with other categories cars: Austrian Formula 3, Formelfrei and Formula 3,5L like (Renault 3,5L from World Series, Lola Cosworth). This section present only the Austrian Formula Renault 2.0L classification.
 Point system: 20, 15, 12, 10, 8, 6, 4, 3, 2, 1 for 10th. No points for Fastest lap or Pole position.

2011 Formula 2000 Light season
This is the fourth season of the Formula 2000 Light held in Italy. The series use Tatuus Formula Renault or Dallara Formula 3 chassis with 2000 cc maximum engines and Michelin tyres. Last year a Formula 2000 Top without Tatuus chassis and less powerful Formula 1600 Light (1.6L) classes was introduced and raced mixed up with the main F2000 class. Since this season it partly races together with the Formula 3000 Light.
Point system: 32, 28, 24, 22, 20, 18, 16, 14, 12, 10, 8, 6, 4, 2, 1 for 15th. In each race 2 point for Fastest lap. 3 points for Pole position in first race.
Races: 2 races by rounds.
All races were held in Italy.

The F2000 championship reward several sub categories:
Over 35: for drivers older than 35 years old (+).
Under 17: for drivers younger than 17 years old (−).
Formula 3: for drivers using Formula 3 chassis (F3).
Team: for racing team involved in all venues.

The rounds a and b held in Imola, March 19–20 are the opening series and do not reward points.

† = Did not finish but classified for standing

(-) = Indicate drivers younger than 17 years old.
(+) = Indicate drivers older than 35 years old.
(L) = Indicate drivers driving in the Light Class
(FA)= Formula Abarth
(FM)= Formula Master
(F3)= Indicate drivers using Dallara or Mygale Formula 3 chassis.
(FG)= Formula Gloria
(w) = indicate women drivers

2011 Formula 2000 Light Winter Trophy
Point system: 32, 28, 24, 22, 20, 18, 16, 14, 12, 10, 8, 6, 4, 2, 1 for 15th. Also 3 points for pole position and 2 for fasted lap.

2011 Formula Renault 2.0 Argentina season

All cars use Tito 02 chassis, all races were held in Argentina.
 Point system: 20, 15, 12, 10, 8, 6, 4, 3, 2, 1 for 10th. 1 point for Pole position. 1 extra point in each race for regularly qualified drivers.

† = Did not qualify regularly

(Needs updating)

2011 Fórmula Renault Plus season
The series is held partially on the same rounds than its secondary series Fórmula Renault Interprovencial. It use Crespi chassis.
 Point system: 20, 15, 12, 10, 8, 6, 4, 3, 2, 1 for 10th. Extra 1 point for Pole position. All drivers receive 1 point for take part of the qualifying session.

2011 Fórmula Renault Interprovencial season
The series is held in the same rounds than its main series Fórmula Renault Plus.
 Point system: 20, 15, 12, 10, 8, 6, 4, 3, 2, 1 for 10th. Extra 1 point for Pole position. All drivers receive 1 point for take part of the qualifying session.

2011 Fórmula Metropolitana season
The series is held in Argentina. Cars use the Renault Clio K4M engine (1598cc) with lower power than the former Fórmula 4 Nacional series held in 2007. Teams can choose chassis manufacturer (Crespi, Tulia, Tito...).
 Point system: 20, 15, 12, 10, 8, 6, 4, 3, 2, 1 for 10th. Extra 1 point for Pole position and 1 point for completed race.

References

Renault
Formula Renault seasons